Aster species are used as food plants by the larvae of a number of Lepidoptera species including:

Monophagous species which feed exclusively on Aster

Bucculatrix leaf miners:
B. cuneigera - feeds on A. shortii
B. errans
B. maritima - feeds on A. tripolium
B. sexnotata
Coleophora case-bearers:
C. astericola
C. asteris
C. bidens - feeds on A. umbellatus
C. dextrella
C. ericoides
C. granifera
C. laurentella
C. longicornella - feeds on A. tripolium
C. simulans
C. sparsipuncta
Schinia septentrionalis

Polyphagous species which feed on Aster among other plants

Bucculatrix angustata
Coleophora case-bearers:
C. acuminatoides - recorded on A. acuminatus
C. annulicola
C. conspicuella
C. corsicella - recorded on A. amellus
C. ditella - recorded on A. sedifolius
C. duplicis
C. linosyridella
C. obscenella - recorded on A. tripolium
C. polemoniella - recorded on A. ericoides
Flame shoulder (Ochropleura plecta)
Hummingbird hawk-moth (Macroglossum stellatarum)
Schinia species
S. arcigera
S. nundina
S. villosa
Wormwood pug (Eupithecia absinthiata)

External links

Aster
+Lepidoptera